Sulemanadbad is a village located in Jund tehsil, Attock district of Punjab, Pakistan. 
The village contains the mountain Kala Chiita Pahar.
Kala Chitta Range is a mountain range located in the  near Sulemanad, Attock District. The range thrusts eastward across the Potohar plateau towards Rawalpindi.

Villages in Attock District